Missing is an EP by Drunk Tank, released on October 31, 1995 by Radial Records. Recorded in 1992, the album was released posthumously after the band had dissolved. The tracks "Missing" and "Accidents" were recorded at Steve Albini's studio in November 1992 and "Crooked Mile" was recorded for a BBC Radio 1 John Peel Session in August 1992.

Track listing

Personnel
Adapted from Missing liner notes.

Drunk Tank
 Alex Barker – electric guitar
 Steven Cerio – drums, cover art
 Julian Mills – vocals, bass guitar

Production and additional personnel
 Steve Albini – recording (1, 3)
 James Birtwistle – recording (2)
 Paul Long – recording (2)

Release history

References

External links 
 

1995 EPs
Drunk Tank albums
Albums produced by Steve Albini
Peel Sessions recordings